

Predicted and scheduled events 
 May – The 2029 Eurovision song contest is scheduled; the location is typically determined by the previous year's winner.
Between winter and autumn 2029, Romania is expected to adopt euro and become the 22nd member of Eurozone.

Date unknown
 Romania expects to have entered the eurozone by this year.

References